Jiraaut Wingwon (born 12 December 2000) is a Thai professional footballer who plays as a winger for Thai League 3 club Songkhla .

References

2000 births
Living people
Jiraaut Wingwon
Association football midfielders
Samutsongkhram F.C. players
Jiraaut Wingwon
Jiraaut Wingwon